Funastrum angustissimum, synonym Sarcostemma angustissima, is a species of plant in the family Apocynaceae. It is endemic to the Galápagos Islands.

References

Flora of the Galápagos Islands
Asclepiadoideae
Least concern plants
Taxonomy articles created by Polbot